Hypolycaena amabilis is a butterfly in the family Lycaenidae. It was described by Lionel de Nicéville in 1895. It is found in South-east Asia.

Subspecies
Hypolycaena amabilis amabilis (Java)
Hypolycaena amabilis lisba (Corbet, 1948) (southern Thailand, Peninsular Malaya, Sumatra, Borneo)

References

Butterflies described in 1895
Hypolycaenini
Butterflies of Borneo
Butterflies of Asia